In the Irish (Hiberno-Scottish) monastic tradition, a lorica is a prayer recited for protection. It is essentially a 'protection prayer' in which the petitioner invokes all the power of God as a safeguard against evil in its many forms. 

The Latin word lōrīca originally meant "armor"  (body armor, in the sense of chainmail or cuirass).
The idea underlying the name is probably derived from Ephesians 6:14, where Paul bids his readers stand, "having put on the breast-plate of righteousness,".
The Greek word here translated as  "breast-plate" is θώραξ, in the Vulgata version rendered lorica.

Invocation

Similar to a litany, the lorica often listed whose protection was requested. "Gabriel be my breastplate, Michael be my belt, Raphael be my shield..."

Notable loricas include Rob tu mo bhoile, a Comdi cride, which in its English translation provides the text for the hymn Be Thou My Vision, the Lorica of Laidcenn, and the Lorica of Gildas.

Lorica of St Patrick 

The Lorica of Saint Patrick, begins:I arise today
Through a mighty strength, the invocation of the Trinity,
Through a belief in the Threeness,
Through confession of the Oneness
Of the Creator of creation.

Linguists cannot trace this lorica back further than the eighth century, which raises the question of whether it was based on an earlier poem dating back to the time of St. Patrick (5th century), or whether it was actually completely unknown to the saint to whom it has been ascribed.

Lorica of St Fursey (or Fursa) 
The Lorica of St Fursa dates from the early seventh century and is still a popular prayer in Ireland. The original text of the Fursey Lorica is held in the British Library. The translation, from Old Irish and German, was made by Fr Francis Mullaghy CSSR and Fr Richard Tobin CSSR, for use in St Joseph's Monastery, Dundalk, Co Louth. This Lorica translation is quoted by John Ó Ríordáin (3) and begins:
<poem></blockquote>The arms of God be around my shoulders,
The touch of the Holy Spirit upon my head,
The sign of Christ’s cross upon my forehead,
The sound of the Holy Spirit in my ears,</poem>

Caim
A "caim" is similar to a lorica only in being a category for a particular type of protection prayer. The word "caim" possibly derives from Scottish Gaelic as listed in the Carmina Gadelica meaning "loop, curve, circle, or sanctuary". As noted on the Wikipedia page however, the Carmina Gadelica is controversial in how accurate it preserved various traditions, and was mostly drawn from the Outer Hebrides. In contrast, the only meaning given in the Dictionarium scoto-celticum for the word "caim" is "fault", and so the etymology is unclear.

The Carmina Gadelica does not contain liturgical rubrics, nor is there a ritual action described that accompanies the prayer. However, one modern usage of a caim prayer involves the creation of an imaginary circle around the self with the index finger while rotating the body.

One prayer that is used can be found in the Carmina Gadelic with additions, and by tradition is often attributed to St. Columba:
Be to me a bright flame before me
Be to me a guiding star above me,
Be to me a smooth path below me,
Be to me a kind shepherd behind me,
Today, tonight, and forever.

References

Sources
 'The Music of What Happens', John Ó Ríordáin, pp. 46–47, The Comumba Press Dublin, 1996
 Add MS 30512 folio.35v

External links
The Lorica of St. Patrick
 The Lorica of St. Fursey
 The Lorica of Gildas

Christian prayer
Christian monasticism